Henri de Dreux (1193–1240) was Archbishop of Reims from 1227 to 1240. He is commemorated by a window in Reims Cathedral.

He was an active builder, but his local taxation provoked a revolt in 1233.

He was a son of Robert II of Dreux and Yolande de Coucy.

Ancestry

Notes

External links
 Stained glass window of Henri in his cathedral

1193 births
1240 deaths
Archbishops of Reims
13th-century Roman Catholic archbishops in France
13th-century peers of France